Rodrigo Bassani da Cruz (born 17 October 1997) is a Brazilian footballer who currently plays as a midfielder for K League 1 club Suwon Samsung Bluewings.

Career statistics

Club

Notes

References

1997 births
Living people
Brazilian footballers
Brazilian expatriate footballers
Association football midfielders
Ituano FC players
Guarani de Palhoça players
Esporte Clube Juventude players
K.S.V. Roeselare players
Club Atlético Zacatepec players
Maringá Futebol Clube players
Figueirense FC players
Suwon Samsung Bluewings players
Challenger Pro League players
Ascenso MX players
K League 1 players
Brazilian expatriate sportspeople in Belgium
Brazilian expatriate sportspeople in Mexico
Brazilian expatriate sportspeople in South Korea
Expatriate footballers in Belgium
Expatriate footballers in Mexico
Expatriate footballers in South Korea
People from São José do Rio Preto
Footballers from São Paulo (state)